Empyreuma heros is a moth of the subfamily Arctiinae. It was described by Marston Bates in 1934. It is found on the Bahamas.

References

Euchromiina
Moths described in 1934